The Uruguay national tennis team represents Uruguay in Davis Cup tennis competition and are governed by the Asociación Uruguaya de Tenis.

Uruguay had been playing in Group II since being relegated in 1996. In 2007, they won the Americas Zone Group II final against Paraguay without losing a rubber, and now competes in the Americas Zone Group I since 2019.

History
Uruguay competed in its first Davis Cup in 1931.  Their best finish has been reaching the World Group play-offs, in 1990 (losing to Mexico), 1992 (losing to The Netherlands), and 1994 (losing to Austria).

Current team (2022)

 Martín Cuevas
 Ignacio Carou
 Franco Roncadelli
 Francisco Llanes
 Joaquín Aguilar

See also
Davis Cup
Uruguay Fed Cup team

External links

Davis Cup teams
Davis Cup
Davis Cup